Upperline Restaurant, or simply Upperline, was a fine dining restaurant in New Orleans, Louisiana, United States. Opened in 1983 by restaurateur JoAnn Clevenger, the restaurant was housed in a yellow townhouse located at 1413 Upperline Street in Uptown New Orleans near the St. Charles Streetcar Line. The restaurant focused on and was celebrated for mixing Cajun, Louisiana Creole, and Southern cuisine. Though Clevenger was not a chef, she developed Upperline's signature dish of fried green tomatoes with shrimp rémoulade, and inspired many other menu items. Upperline temporarily closed in March 2020 as a result of the COVID-19 pandemic. In November 2021, Clevenger announced the restaurant would not be reopening and that she and her family planned to sell the building and possibly the business.

History
JoAnn Clevenger's grandparents were sharecroppers in Alexandria, Louisiana. As a child in the 1950s, Clevenger and her family lived in Superior, Arizona, until they moved to New Orleans because Clevenger's mother sought medical treatment for a fungal infection at Charity Hospital. During the 1960s and 1970s Clevenger worked as a bartender on Bourbon Street and became involved in the bohemian scene in New Orleans, meeting playwright Tennessee Williams, photographer Lee Friedlander, artist Noel Rockmore, and other well-known figures.

Clevenger opened Upperline in 1983 and co-owned it with her son Jason Clevenger—the restaurant's first chef—and husband Alan Greenacre. Upperline temporarily closed in March 2020 as a result of the COVID-19 pandemic. In November 2021, Clevenger announced the restaurant would not be reopening and that she and her family planned to sell the building and possibly the business.

Art
Upperline was celebrated for its art collection focused on local artists. The collection contained at least 400 artworks, including portraits of Clevenger and Upperline staff members, a painting of artist Gertrude Morgan by Noel Rockmore, another Rockmore painting of New Orleans musician Frank Moliere, and renditions by other artists of New Orleans musicians James Booker and Buddy Bolden. Clevenger began the collection in 1960, when she briefly managed an art gallery in the French Quarter. The collection was offered for sale as part of Upperline's November 2021 closing.

Reception
Upperline was popular with local residents and the cultural elite alike. Led Zeppelin lead singer Robert Plant, Amazon founder Jeff Bezos, novelist and philanthropist MacKenzie Scott, and relatives of The New York Times executive editor and New Orleans native Dean Baquet—among many other well-known figures—dined at the restaurant.

JoAnn Clevenger was widely acclaimed for her skills as a hostess, known for building connections between her guests. According to Clevenger, Bezos and Scott dined at Upperline (they were married at the time) the same evening as Dean Baquet's relatives. Clevenger introduced them to each other, as Bezos owns The Washington Post, a rival newspaper of The New York Times: "I gave them each a little note, telling them who was at the other table. It's about connections." Clevenger also handed Scott a printed list of New Orleans bookstores, and said of the experience: "It felt really good that I could give them a list of these brick-and-mortar stores he's [Bezos] on the way to destroying." Author and New Orleans native Walter Isaacson said of Clevenger, "She knew how to tie together great ingredients, both in her dishes and her dining room." Gabriel Stafford—who had worked at Upperline for 11 years when the restaurant closed—said of Clevenger: "I found JoAnn to be an intoxicating character. I felt like I was ensconced in New Orleans-ness while working there [at Upperline]."

Popular culture
Upperline's roast duck was featured as one of chef Simon Majumdar's favorite dishes in Season 4, Episode 10 of the television program The Best Thing I Ever Ate.

See also
 List of Cajun restaurants
 List of Louisiana Creole restaurants
 List of Southern restaurants

References

External links
Upperline website

1983 establishments in Louisiana
2021 disestablishments in Louisiana
Buildings and structures in New Orleans
Cuisine of New Orleans
Defunct Cajun restaurants in the United States
Louisiana Creole restaurants in the United States
Restaurants disestablished in 2021
Restaurants established in 1983
Restaurants in New Orleans
Southern restaurants